The southern dog-faced bat (Cynomops planirostris),  is a bat species of the family Molossidae. It is found in northern Argentina, Bolivia, Brazil, Colombia, French Guiana, Guyana, Panama, Peru, Paraguay, Suriname and Venezuela.

References

Cynomops
Mammals described in 1866
Bats of South America
Mammals of Colombia
Taxa named by Wilhelm Peters
Bats of Central America